Vonlanthen is a Swiss surname. Notable people with the surname include:

 Jo Vonlanthen (born 1942), Swiss racing driver
 Johan Vonlanthen (born 1986), Swiss footballer
 Marcel Vonlanthen (born 1933), Swiss footballer
 Roger Vonlanthen (1930–2020), Swiss footballer

Swiss-German surnames